A lunette is a moon-shaped architectural detail.

Lunette may also refer to:
Lunette (fortification), an outwork consisting of a salient angle with two flanks and an open gorge
Lunette (Gargoyles), a fictional character in the animated television series "Gargoyles"
Lunette (geology), a wind-formed crescent dune shape
Lunette (stele), the curved top region of a stele (pillar-shaped monument), especially from ancient Egypt
Lunette Peak, a mountain on the border of the Canadian provinces of Alberta and British Columbia 
Lunette (container), a small enclosure for the Eucharistic host in the Roman Catholic and Anglo-Catholic churches
Musée des Lunettes et Lorgnettes Pierre Marly, a museum of eyeglasses in Paris

See also
Lunula (disambiguation)
Lune (disambiguation)